Claire M. Breen is a New Zealand law academic, and as of 2021 is a full professor at the University of Waikato. Her work focuses on children's legal rights, international human rights and international peace and security.

Academic career 

Breen has a Bachelor of Civil Law from University College Cork, and an LLM (International Law) from the University of Nottingham. After a PhD titled The standard of the best interests of the child as a tradition of Western inconsistencies at the University of Nottingham in 1999, Breen moved to the University of Waikato, rising to full professor in 2019.

Recent articles by Breen cover a range of issues, including how New Zealand should deal with the return of an alleged ISIS terrorist to New Zealand, with reference to the rights of the two children involved, access to beaches for some disabled people, and how the ACC system discriminates against women by not covering birth injuries.

Selected works

References 

Living people
New Zealand women academics
Year of birth missing (living people)
New Zealand legal scholars
Alumni of the University of Nottingham
Academic staff of the University of Waikato
Alumni of University College Cork